KRGI (1430 AM) is a radio station broadcasting a News Talk Information format. Licensed to Grand Island, Nebraska, United States, the station serves the Grand Island-Kearney area.  The station is currently owned by Legacy Communications, LLC and features programming from ABC Radio  and Premiere Radio Networks.

References

External links

FCC History Cards for KRGI

RGI